I Want You may refer to:

Film and television
 I Want You (1951 film), directed by Mark Robson and starring Dana Andrews
 I Want You (1998 film), a film starring Rachel Weisz
 "I Want You (She's So Heavy)" (The Simpsons), a 2019 episode of The Simpsons
 Tengo ganas de ti, a 2012 Spanish drama film distributed in English as I Want You

Music

Albums
 I Want You (Booker T album), 1981
 I Want You (Carried Away album), 2007
 I Want You (Marvin Gaye album), 1976
 I Want You (Shana album), 1989
 I Want You, 1991 album by American singer Marc Nelson
 I Want You, 1979 album by Wilson Pickett, or its title track

Songs
 "I Want U", by Alison Wonderland, 2014
 "I Want You" (Bob Dylan song), 1966
 "I Want You (She's So Heavy)", by The Beatles, 1969
 "I Want You" (Cheap Trick song), 1982
 "I Want You" (Common song), 2007
 "I Want You" (Elvis Costello song), 1986
 "I Want You" (Gary Low song), 1983
 "I Want You" (Janet Jackson song), 2004
 "I Want You" (Jody Watley song), 1991
 "I Want You" (Martin Solveig song), 2008
 "I Want You" (Marvin Gaye song), 1976, covered in 1990 by Robert Palmer covered as a medley with "Mercy Mercy Me", and by Madonna with Massive Attack in 1995
 "I Want You" (Paris Avenue song), 2004
 "I Want You" (Roxette song), 1987
 "I Want You" (Savage Garden song), 1996
 "I Want You" (Shana song), 1989
 "I Want You" (Thalía song), 2003
 "I Want You" (Toni Pearen song), 1993
 "I Want You" (Wa Wa Nee song), 1989
 "I Want You (Hold On to Love)", a song by CeeLo Green, 2011
 "I Want You" by 2PM, from the album Genesis of 2PM, 2014
 "I Want You" by Afrob, from the album , 2009
 "I Want You" by Air Supply, from the album Across the Concrete Sky, 2003
 "I Want You" by Alexia, from the album Happy, 1999
 "I Want You" by Angelyne, from the album Angelyne, 1982
 "I Want You" by Animotion, from the album Strange Behavior, 1986
 "I Want You" by The Armada, from the album The Armada, 2008
 "I Want You" by Arthur Loves Plastic, from the album Brief Episodes of Joy, 2008
 "I Want You" by Babyface featuring After 7, from the album Return of the Tender Lover, 2015
 "I Want You" by Erykah Badu, from the album Worldwide Underground, 2003
 "I Want You" by The Beau Brummels, from the album The Beau Brummels, Volume 2, 1965
 "I Want You" by Kasper Bjørke, 2001
 "I Want You" by Mary J. Blige, from the soundtrack for the film Think Like a Man Too, 2014
 "I Want You" by The Blue Van, from the album The Art of Rolling, 2005
 "I Want You" by Bon Jovi, from the album Keep the Faith, 1992
 "I Want You" by The Graham Bond Organization, from the album The Sound of '65, 1965
 "I Want You" by Brothers Johnson, from the album Winners, 1981
 "I Want You" by Buckcherry, from the album All Night Long, 2010
 "I Want You" by Lindsey Buckingham, from the album Go Insane, 1984
 "I Want You" by Kandi Burruss, from the album Kandi Koated, 2010
 "I Want You" by Jonathan Byrd, from the album This Is the New That, 2007
 "I Want You" by Cabaret Voltaire, from the album The Covenant, The Sword, and the Arm of the Lord, 1985
 "I Want You" by Anthony Callea, from the album Anthony Callea, 2005
 "I Want You" by Calloway, from the album All the Way, 1989
 "I Want You" by Celly Cel, from the album It'z Real Out Here, 2005
 "I Want You" by Kelly Clarkson, from the album All I Ever Wanted, 2009
 "I Want You" by Dean Coleman, remixed by Dave Audé, 2009
 "I Want You" by Concrete Blonde, B-side of the single "Joey", 1990
 "I Want You" by Ida Corr, from the album Under the Sun, 2009
 "I Want You" by Sheryl Crow, from the album C'mon, C'mon, 2002
 "I Want You" by Alana Davis, from the album Fortune Cookies, 2001
 "I Want You" by Dead or Alive, from the album Mad, Bad, and Dangerous to Know, 1987
 "I Want You" by Chico DeBarge, from the album Addiction, 2009
 "I Want You" by Delain, from the album We Are the Others, 2012
 "I Want You" by Fefe Dobson, from the album Joy, 2010
 "I Want You" by Elliot Easton, from the album Change No Change, 1985
 "I Want You" by Electrico, from the album So Much More Inside, 2004
 "I Want You" by Melissa Etheridge, from the album Melissa Etheridge, 1988
 "I Want You" by Sara Evans, from the album Words, 2017
 "I Want You" by Friday Hill, from the album Times Like These, 2006
 "I Want You" by The Godfathers, from the album Hit by Hit, 1986
 "I Want You" by Great White, from the album Psycho City, 1992
 "I Want You" by Hanoi Rocks, from the album Self Destruction Blues, 1982
 "I Want You" by Debbie Harry, from the album Rockbird, 1986
 "I Want You" by Sophie B. Hawkins, from the album Tongues and Tails, 1992
 "I Want You" by Mark Heard, from the album Mosaics, 1985
 "I Want You" by Michael Hedges, from the album Watching My Life Go By, 1985
 "I Want You" by Faith Hill, from the album Fireflies, 2005
 "I Want You" by Paris Hilton, from the album Paris, 2006
 "I Want You" by Holly Cole, from the album Temptation, 1995
 "I Want You" by Inspiral Carpets, from the album Devil Hopping, 1994
 "I Want You" by Janez Detd., from the album For Better For Worse, 2008
 "I Want You" by Joan Jett, from the album Notorious, 1991
 "I Want You" by Nick Jonas, from the album Nick Jonas, 2014
 "I Want You" by Danko Jones, from the album We Sweat Blood, 2003
 "I Want You" by Kid Courageous, from the album Dear Diary, 2006
 "I Want You" by Kings of Leon, from the album Only by the Night, 2008
 "I Want You" by Kiss, from the album Rock and Roll Over, 1976
 "I Want You" by The Kooks, from the album Inside In/Inside Out, 2006
 "I Want You" by Blake Lewis featuring Samantha James, from the album Portrait of a Chameleon, 2014
 "I Want You" by Huey Lewis and the News, from the album Huey Lewis and the News, 1980
 "I Want You" by LL Cool J, from the album Radio, 1985
 "I Want You" by Lollipop, from the album Popstars, 2001
 "I Want You" by Traci Lords, from the album 1000 Fires, 1995
 "I Want You" by David Lynch, from the album The Big Dream, 2013
 "I Want You" by The Maine, from the album Pioneer and the Good Love, 2012
 "I Want You" by Marky Mark and the Funky Bunch, from the album You Gotta Believe, 1992
 "I Want You" by Michael McDonald, from the album Blink of an Eye, 1993
 "I Want You" by Michael McDonald, from the album Motown, 2003
 "I Want You" by Christine McVie, from the album Christine Perfect, 1970
 "I Want You" by Marco Mendoza, from the album Live for Tomorrow, 2007
 "I Want You" by Chrisette Michele, from the album Let Freedom Reign, 2010
 "I Want You" by Milk, from the album With Freshness, 2001
 "I Want You" by Milky, from the album Star, 2002
 "I Want You" by Moloko, from the album Statues, 2003
 "I Want You" by Mugison, from the album Mugimama Is This Monkey Music?, 2004
 "I Want You" by Dolores O'Riordan, from the album No Baggage, 2009
 "I Want You" by The Party, from the album Free, 1992
 "I Want You!" by Peter Bjorn and John, from the album Living Thing, 2009
 "I Want You" by Mike Peters, from the album Rise, 1998
 "I Want You" by PJ & Duncan AKA, from the album Psyche, 1994
 "I Want You" by Jesse Powell, from the album Jesse, 2003
 "I Want You" by Praga Khan, from the album Pragamatic, 1998
 "I Want You" by Pulp, from the album Freaks, 1987
 "I Want You" by Rage, from the album Trapped!, 1992
 "I Want You" by Real McCoy, from the album Another Night, 1995
 "I Want You" by Jessica Riddle, from the album Key of a Minor, 2000
 "I Want You" by Rivermaya, from the album Buhay, 2008
 "I Want You" by Juliet Roberts, from the album Natural Thing, 1994
 "I Want You" by Diana Ross, from the album I Love You, 2006
 "I Want You" by Saliva, from the album Survival of the Sickest, 2004
 "I Want You" by Sandra, from the album Back to Life, 2009
 "I Want You" by Savant, from the album Ninur, 2011
 "I Want You" by Michael Schenker Group, from the album In the Midst of Beauty, 2008
 "I Want You" by Shack, from the album H.M.S. Fable, 1999
 "I Want You" by The Silencers, from the album Dance to the Holy Man, 1991
 "I Want You" by Horace Silver, from the album The Hardbop Grandpop, 1996
 "I Want You" by Sizzla, from the album Ghetto Revolutionary, 2002
 "I Want You" by Snow, from the album Justuss, 1997
 "I Want You" by Soul for Real, from the album Heat, 1999
 "I Want You" by Spiritualized, from the album Lazer Guided Melodies, 1992
 "I Want You" by Squeeze, from the album Ridiculous, 1995
 "I Want You" by SS501, from the album All My Love, 2009
 "I Want You" by Stiff Little Fingers, from the album Get a Life, 1994
 "I Want You" by Surf City, from the album We Knew It Was Not Going to Be Like This, 2013
 "I Want You" by Keith Sweat, from the album Rebirth, 2002
 "I Want You" by Taken by Trees, from the album Other Worlds, 2012
 "I Want You" by Third Eye Blind, from the album Third Eye Blind, 1997
 "I Want You" by Jeanie Tracy, from the album Me and You, 1982
 "I Want You" by The Troggs, from the album From Nowhere, 1966
 "I Want You" by Bonnie Tyler, from the album Simply Believe, 2004
 "I Want You" by U;Nee, from the album Call Call Call, 2005
 "I Want You" by Utah Saints, from the album Utah Saints, 1992
 "I Want You" by Tom Waits, from the album The Early Years, Volume Two, 1993
 "I Want You" by Narada Michael Walden, from the album Victory, 1980
 "I Want You" by Kim Waters featuring Vivian Green, from the album I Want You: Love in the Spirit of Marvin, 2008
 "I Want You" by Wet Wet Wet, from the album 10, 1997
 "I Want You" by The Whispers, from the album Just Gets Better with Time, 1987
 "I Want You" by Tony Joe White, from the album ...Continued, 1969
 "I Want You" by Deniece Williams, from the album Let's Hear It for the Boy, 1984
 "I Want You" by Rachael Yamagata, from the album Happenstance, 2004
 "I Want You" by Zard, from the album Yureru Omoi, 1993
 "I Want You #35" by Rodney Crowell, from the album Sex & Gasoline, 2008
 "I Want You Remix" by Lloyd featuring Andre 3000 and Nas, from the album Street Love, 2007
 "I Want You (Girlfriend)" by Pretty Ricky, from the album Bluestars, 2005
 "I Want You (I'm an 80's Man)" by Prince Paul, from the album Itstrumental, 2005
 " (I Want You)" by Malice Mizer, from the album , 1998
 " (I Want You)", a song written by Erik Satie
 " (I Want You)" by Roupa Nova, from the album , 2009
 "Tomake Chai" ("I Want You") by Kabir Suman, 1992
 " (I Want You)" by Antique, from the album , 1999
 " (I Want You)" by Sambomaster, from the album , 2010
 " (I Want You)" by Seo In-young, from the album Elly Is So Hot, 2007
 "I Want You, I Need You, I Love You", a song by Elvis Presley, 1956
 "I Want You Right Now", a song by MC5, from the album Kick Out the Jams, 1969
 "I Want You to Need Me", a song by Céline Dion, 2000
 "I Want You to Want Me", a song by Cheap Trick, 1977

See also
 I Want You Back (disambiguation)
 I Want You So Bad (disambiguation)
 I Want You to Know (disambiguation)
 You Want Me (disambiguation)
 Te Quiero (disambiguation)
 "I Want YOU for U. S. Army", the text of a U.S. military recruitment poster by J. M. Flagg